"J'en rêve encore" (English : "I Still Dream about It") is a 2000 pop / rock song recorded by French singer-songwriter Gérald de Palmas. It was the first single from his third album Marcher dans le sable on which it appears as second track and was released on 6 November 2000. It was written by Jean-Jacques Goldman and composed by Gérald De Palmas. It was successful in France and Belgium (Wallonia) where it was a top ten hit.

Background and release
De Palmas explained how the song was created : "After my second album, I tried to compose, and what I do didn't really liked me. I went into a sort of vicious circle. I went to see Jean-Jacques Goldman, asking him, possibly, a text on one of four or five songs that I've composed at the time." He also said that Goldman helped him to regain self-confidence after his period of artistic vacuum. In another interview, De Palmas revealed that he was first tense when he recorded the song, then relax because the text pleased to him. He asked Goldman to make some changes to the text, then decided to remove these changes and to restore the original version.

"J'en rêve encore" deals with the "painful story of a broken but nagging love". A music video was shot and shows images of the singer driving a car at night, alternating with those of a couple. The song was much aired on radio when it was released and allowed De Palmas to took up again with the success and to win a Victoires de la Musique in 2002. The song notably appears on the French series of compilations NRJ Music Awards 2002 and on Les plus grandes chansons du siècle vol. 2 and Hits de diamant. It was also performed by De Palmas during his 2002 concert tour and was thus included on his live album entitled Live 2002.

Chart performances and cover versions
In France, the single started at number 41 on the SNEP chart on 11 November 2000 and reached a peak of number seven 17 weeks after. It totalled seven weeks in the top ten and 31 weeks on the chart (top 100). In Belgium (Wallonia), the single debuted at number 22 on 3 March 2001 and peaked at number four in its fourth week. It remained for 14 weeks on the Ultratop 50. To date, "J'en rêve encore" is the singer's biggest hit throughout his career.

In 2003, the song was notably covered by Francis Cabrel, Lorie and David Hallyday for Les Enfoirés' album La foire aux Enfoirés, also available on the 2005 best of La compil' (Vol. 3). The same year, Gérard Blanc performed the song on the French television programme Retour gagnant, aired in May 2003, and eventually recorded as a track for the album named after the show.

Track listings
 CD single

 Digital download (since 2005)

Credits and personnel
 Lyrics by Jean-Jacques Goldman (track 1) and Raoul Nativel (track 2)
 Music by Gérald De Palmas
 Editions : JRG / Sur la route Productions
 Photography by Bernard Benant
 Artwork by Restez Vivants !

Release history

Charts and sales

Peak positions

End of year charts

Certifications and sales

References

External links
  Gérald De Palmas — "J'en rêve encore" All bout the song, on Parler de sa vie (see: "Chansons" => "J'en rêve encore")

2000 singles
2001 singles
Gérald de Palmas songs
Polydor Records singles
Songs written by Jean-Jacques Goldman
Songs written by Gérald de Palmas
2000 songs